Prabhu is a 1979 Indian Malayalam-language film,  directed by Baby. The film stars Prem Nazir, Jayan, Kaviyoor Ponnamma and Adoor Bhasi. The film's score was composed by Shankar–Ganesh.

Cast
Prem Nazir as Prabhu
Jayan as Vishwanathan / Vishwam
Kaviyoor Ponnamma-janaki
Adoor Bhasi as Amita Bhakshanam
Jose Prakash
Nellikode Bhaskaran
Sasi
Seema
Surekha

Soundtrack

References

External links
 

1979 films
1970s Malayalam-language films
Films scored by Shankar–Ganesh
Films directed by Baby (director)